José Ricardo Álvarez (born May 6, 1989) is a Venezuelan  professional baseball pitcher who is a free agent. He has played in Major League Baseball (MLB) for the Detroit Tigers, Los Angeles Angels, Philadelphia Phillies and San Francisco Giants.

He was signed as an international free agent by the  Boston Red Sox in 2005. In the minor leagues, Álvarez was a  New York–Penn League mid-season All Star, and a  Florida State League mid-season All Star. In the winter of 2014–15, he was named Venezuelan Professional Baseball League Pitcher of the Year. In  he was second in the American League in appearances, with 76.

Career

Álvarez was born in Barcelona, Anzoátegui, Venezuela.

Boston Red Sox (2005–09)
He was signed as an international free agent by the Boston Red Sox in July 2005. In 2006 with the DSL Red Sox of the Dominican Summer League, Álvarez was 2–1 with a 1.61 ERA and 64 strikeouts in 61 innings. In 2007 with the GCL Red Sox of the Gulf Coast League he was 4–1 with a 1.84 ERA (third in the league) and 38 strikeouts in 49 innings. In 2008 with the Greenville Drive of the Class A  South Atlantic League he was 8–9 with a 5.70 ERA, and 86 strikeouts in 118 innings.

In 2009, pitching for the Lowell Spinners in the A- New York-Pennsylvania League, Álvarez was a mid-season All Star, and ended the season 8–3 for the Spinners with a 1.52 ERA (3rd in the league, and tops in the Boston farm system), and 63 strikeouts in 83 innings. He also pitched for the Salem Red Sox in the Class A+ Carolina League, and was 1–1 with a 4.74 ERA, and 11 strikeouts in 24 innings.

Florida Marlins (2010–12)
Álvarez advanced as high as Class A ball before being traded in November 2009 with Hunter Jones to the Florida Marlins organization for Jeremy Hermida. In 2010 Álvarez was third in the Class A South Atlantic League in wins as he went 10–3 with the Greensboro Grasshoppers with a 3.58 ERA and 113 strikeouts in 108 innings. 

In 2011, pitching for the Jupiter Hammerheads in the A+ Florida State League, Álvarez was a mid-season All Star, and ended the season 6–5 for the Hammerheads with a 2.96 ERA, with 73 strikeouts in 82 innings. He was a two-time winner of the best changeup in the Florida Marlins farm system. 

In 2012 he pitched for the Jacksonville Suns in the AA Southern League. Álvarez was league Pitcher of the Week for the week ended June 25, and for the season was 6–9 with a 4.22 ERA, with 3 complete games (tied for the league lead), 1.66 walks per nine innings (tops among league starters), and 70 strikeouts in 136 innings.

Detroit Tigers (2012–14)
At the end of the 2012 season Álvarez was released, and he was picked up by the Detroit Tigers on November 8, 2012, as a minor league free agent.

Álvarez was invited as a non-roster free agent by the Detroit Tigers to their 2013 spring training. He played for the Class AAA Toledo Mud Hens, where by June 2013 he was leading the International League in strikeouts, Walks plus hits per innings pitched (WHIP), and baserunners per nine innings.

Álvarez was called up to the majors for the first time on June 9, 2013, and made his debut starting in place of Aníbal Sánchez. He recorded a win and a quality start, pitching six innings while striking out seven against the Cleveland Indians. He was sent back to the Toledo Mud Hens that same day and was recalled June 20 to start again in place of Sánchez. On August 28, Alvarez was sent back to Toledo. In 2013 with the Tigers he was 1–5 with one save and a 5.82 ERA, with 31 strikeouts in 38 innings. With Toledo, he was 8–6 with a 2.80 ERA (4th in the league), 5th in the league with a .235 batting average against and 1.79 walks per nine innings, and 115 strikeouts (10th) in 128 innings. He was named Detroit Tigers 2013 Minor League Pitcher of the Year. Baseball America named him as having the best change up and control in the International League.

Los Angeles Angels of Anaheim/Los Angeles Angels (2014–18)

On March 21, 2014, the Tigers traded Álvarez to the Los Angeles Angels of Anaheim for shortstop Andrew Romine. He made two scoreless appearances for the Angels in 2014.

In the winter of 2014–15 he pitched for the Caribes de Anzoategui of the Venezuelan Winter League, and was named Venezuelan Winter League Pitcher of the Year after leading the league in wins. Álvarez was 6–1 with two saves and a 1.91 ERA, with 40 strikeouts in 56 innings. 

Álvarez was called upon by the Angels 64 times in the 2015 season, posting a 4–3 record with a 3.49 ERA, and 59 strikeouts in 67 IP. He was tied for sixth in the American League with 19 relief appearances of more than one inning pitched.

In 2016, Álvarez made 64 appearances for the Angels.  He registered a 1–3 record and an ERA of 3.45, with 51 strikeouts in  innings. 

He pitched in four games for Team Venezuela in the 2017 World Baseball Classic.

Álvarez made 64 appearances for the third straight season in 2017 for the Angels, registering an 0–3 record with one save and an ERA of 3.88 and 45 strikeouts in  innings. Among left-handed relief pitchers, his 83% stranded rate was 6th in the major leagues (minimum 30 innings). Lefthanders batted .245/.252/.462 against him, with one walk and 26 strikeouts. 

In 2018, Álvarez was 6–4 with one save and posted career bests in games (76; 2nd-most in the American League), wins (6), and ERA (2.71; 4th among left-handed AL relievers), and tied his career high with 59 strikeouts. He allowed three home runs over 63 innings, and limited left-handed batters to batting .206/.265/.338 against him with nine walks and 34 strikeouts. He was 5th among all MLB relievers, stranding 86.0% of inherited runners.

Philadelphia Phillies (2019–20)
On December 6, 2018, Álvarez was traded to the Philadelphia Phillies, for relief pitcher Luis Garcia. Alvarez made his first start in five years on June 1, 2019, as the Phillies' opener against the Los Angeles Dodgers. In 2019 with the Phillies he was 3–4 with one save and a 3.36 ERA, as he pitched in 67 games (one start) over 59 innings. 

In 2020, during an August 20 game against the Toronto Blue Jays, Alvarez was struck in the groin by a line drive hit, leading to an injury that caused him to be inactive for the remainder of the season. In 2020 he was 0–0 with a 1.42 ERA in 6 innings in which he struck out 6 batters over eight games.

San Francisco Giants (2021–2022)
On March 6, 2021, Álvarez signed a one-year, $1.15 million contract with the San Francisco Giants, that included a $1.5 million club option for 2022.

In the 2021 regular season, Álvarez was 5–2 with a career-best 2.37 ERA in 67 games (1 start), in which he pitched 64 innings and allowed 7.4 hits per 9 innings pitched.

In 2022, Álvarez made 21 appearances for San Francisco, posting a 2–1 record and 5.28 ERA with 15 strikeouts in 15.1 innings pitched. He was placed on the injured list in early July with left elbow inflammation. On September 2, 2022, Álvarez underwent Tommy John surgery, ending his 2022 and 2023 seasons.

See also
 List of Major League Baseball players from Venezuela

Notes

References

External links

José Álvarez at Pura Pelota (Venezuelan Professional Baseball League)

1989 births
Living people
Caribes de Anzoátegui players
Caribes de Oriente players
Detroit Tigers players
Dominican Summer League Red Sox players
Greensboro Grasshoppers players
Greenville Drive players
Gulf Coast Red Sox players
Jacksonville Suns players
Jupiter Hammerheads players
Los Angeles Angels players
Lowell Spinners players
Major League Baseball pitchers
Major League Baseball players from Venezuela
People from Barcelona, Venezuela
Philadelphia Phillies players
Salem Red Sox players
Salt Lake Bees players
San Francisco Giants players
Toledo Mud Hens players
Venezuelan expatriate baseball players in the United States
World Baseball Classic players of Venezuela
2017 World Baseball Classic players
Venezuelan expatriate baseball players in the Dominican Republic